The Rural Municipality of Fertile Belt No. 183 is a rural municipality (RM) in the Canadian province of Saskatchewan within Census Division No. 5 and  Division No. 1.

History 
The RM of Fertile Belt No. 183 incorporated as a rural municipality on January 1, 1913.

Historical properties
There are two historical properties located within the RM.

Our Lady of Assumption (Kaposvar) Roman Catholic Church - (also called Kaposvar Museum) Located in Esterhazy, the building was erected in 1906-1907 by Brothers of Father Jules Pirot with Hungarian farmers hauling stones from the surrounding area.
New Stockholm Lutheran Church - (also called Swedish Evangelical Lutheran New Stockholm Church) the building was erected in 1917 by Swedish immigrants. The church is located in the village of Stockholm.

Geography

Communities and localities 
The following urban municipalities are surrounded by the RM.

Towns
 Esterhazy

Villages
 Atwater
 Bangor
 Stockholm

The following unincorporated communities are within the RM.

Organized hamlets
Pelican Shores

Localities
 Zeneta

Demographics 

Government 
The RM of Fertile Belt No. 183 is governed by an elected municipal council and an appointed administrator that meets on the second Tuesday of every month. The reeve of the RM is Arlynn Kurtz while its administrator is Lorie Jackson. The RM's office is located in Stockholm.

Transportation 
The Esterhazy Airport is located within the rural municipality.

References 

F

Division No. 5, Saskatchewan